Macrostomus arcucinctus is a species of dance flies, in the fly family Empididae.

References

Macrostomus
Insects described in 1909
Taxa named by Mario Bezzi
Diptera of South America